A snow knife or snow saw (Inuktitut: pana) is a tool used in the construction of igluit (snow houses) or as a weapon by Inuit of the Arctic. The snow knife was originally made from available materials such as bone or horn but the Inuit adapted to using metal after the arrival of Europeans.

Historical descriptions
The American Association for the Advancement of Science noted in 1883:

See also
 Tomahawk
 Ulu

References

Knives
Construction equipment
Inuit tools
Inuit weapons